KBCC-LP (107.9 FM) was a low-power FM radio station broadcasting a contemporary Christian music format. Formerly licensed to Cave Junction, Oregon, United States, the station was owned by Bridgeview Community Church.

History
The Federal Communications Commission issued a construction permit for the station on August 5, 2002. The station was assigned the KBCC-LP call sign on September 4, 2002, and was granted its license to cover on June 20, 2003. The station's license was cancelled and its call sign deleted from the FCC's database on May 10, 2011.

References

External links
 

BCC-LP
Cave Junction, Oregon
Radio stations established in 2003
BCC-LP
Radio stations disestablished in 2011
Defunct radio stations in the United States
2003 establishments in Oregon
Defunct religious radio stations in the United States
2011 disestablishments in Oregon
BCC-LP